Reticulidia fungia is a species of sea slug, a dorid nudibranch, a shell-less marine gastropod mollusk in the family Phyllidiidae.

Description
This species grows to a maximum length of 40 mm. Reticulidia fungia does not grow as large as Reticulidia halgerda. It also has broad-based ridges, those being fewer in number than those of Reticulidia halgerda. The base of these ridges have a fine, white border. The mantle margin is broad and blue-grey in colour. It has a single, black line around the side of its foot occurring slightly above its gills.

Distribution
Reticulidia fungia occurs in such areas as:
Fiji
Micronesia
Eastern Australia
Taiwan
Christmas Island
Bali
Ningaloo Reef, Western Australia

References

External links
 

Phyllidiidae
Gastropods described in 1993